Deh-e Now (also known as Deh-e Now-ye Shīvand) is a village in Donbaleh Rud-e Jonubi Rural District, Dehdez District, Izeh County, Khuzestan Province, Iran. At the 2006 census, its population was 134, in 26 families.

References 

Populated places in Izeh County